The Halophryninae is a largely Old World subfamily of toadfish, part of the family Batrachoididae.

Genera
The following genera are classified as members of the Halophryninae:

 Allenbatrachus Greenfield, 1997 
 Austrobatrachus J.L.B. Smith, 1949
 Barchatus J.L.B. Smith, 1952
 Batrachomoeus Ogilby, 1908
 Batrichthys J.L.B. Smith, 1934
 Bifax Greenfield, Mee and Randall, 1994
 Chatrabus J.L.B. Smith, 1949
 Colletteichthys Greenfield, 2006
 Halobatrachus Ogilby, 1908
 Halophryne Gill, 1863
 Perulibatrachus Roux and Whitley, 1972
 Riekertia J.L.B. Smith, 1952
 Triathalassothia Fowler, 1943

References

Batrachoididae
Fish subfamilies